Diego Mini Cuadros (born 13 April 1999) is a Peruvian badminton player. He won the bronze at the 2016 Pan Am Badminton Championships in the mixed doubles and team event. Teamed up with Zornoza, they lost in the semi final round to Canadian pair with the score 0-2. He also the runner-up of the Peru International Series tournament partnered with Zornoza. He was the silver medallists at the 2018 South American Games in the men's doubles and mixed team event.

Achievements

Pan Am Championships 
Men's doubles

Mixed doubles

South American Games 
Men's doubles

BWF International Challenge/Series 
Men's doubles

Mixed doubles

  BWF International Challenge tournament
  BWF International Series tournament
  BWF Future Series tournament

References

External links 

 

Living people
1999 births
Sportspeople from Lima
Peruvian male badminton players
Badminton players at the 2019 Pan American Games
Pan American Games competitors for Peru
South American Games silver medalists for Peru
South American Games medalists in badminton
Competitors at the 2018 South American Games
21st-century Peruvian people